Nguyễn Phan Quế Mai (born 1973) is an award-winning Vietnamese poet and novelist. She is the author of ten books of poetry, fiction and non-fiction in Vietnamese and English. She started her writing career with poetry in Vietnamese and has been honored with some of the top literary awards in Vietnam including the Poetry of the Year 2010 Award from the Hanoi Writers Association, First Prize, the Poetry about 1,000 Years Hanoi, as well as the Capital's Arts & Literature Award. Her debut novel, and first book written in English, The Mountains Sing, was released in 2020. The novel is a fictional family saga that gives voice to rarely documented historical events. The book has become an international bestseller, and was runner-up for the 2021 Dayton Literary Peace Prize, winner of the 2020 BookBrowse Best Debut Award, the 2021 International Book Awards, the 2021 PEN Oakland/Josephine Miles Literary Award, and the 2020 Lannan Literary Award Fellowship for Fiction. Quế Mai's writing has been translated into twenty languages and has appeared in major publications including the New York Times. She has a PhD in Creative Writing from Lancaster University. She was named by Forbes Vietnam as one of 20 inspiring women of 2021. Her second novel in English, Dust Child, is forthcoming in March 2023.

References

1973 births
Living people
Vietnamese women poets
Vietnamese writers
English-language literature of Vietnam